Shooting events at the 1987 Southeast Asian Games was held between 10 September to 17 September at Senayan Sports Complex.

Medal summary

Men

Women

Medal table

References
 https://eresources.nlb.gov.sg/newspapers/Digitised/Article/straitstimes19870911-1.2.56.38
https://news.google.com/newspapers?nid=x8G803Bi31IC&dat=19870911&printsec=frontpage&hl=en
 http://eresources.nlb.gov.sg/newspapers/Digitised/Article/straitstimes19870912-1.2.44.15.15.aspx?refer=similar
 http://eresources.nlb.gov.sg/newspapers/Digitised/Article/straitstimes19870913-1.2.43.4
 http://eresources.nlb.gov.sg/newspapers/Digitised/Article/straitstimes19870914-1.2.43.35
 http://eresources.nlb.gov.sg/newspapers/Digitised/Article/straitstimes19870915-1.2.50.28
 http://eresources.nlb.gov.sg/newspapers/Digitised/Article/straitstimes19870917-1.2.57.22.4
 http://eresources.nlb.gov.sg/newspapers/Digitised/Article/straitstimes19870918-1.2.48.21.7
 Berita Harian article

Shooting at the Southeast Asian Games
1987 Southeast Asian Games
Shooting competitions in Indonesia